This list of countries by rail transport network size based on International Union of Railways data ranks countries by length of rail lines worked at end of year updated with other reliable sources. These figures also include urban/suburban mass-transport systems, as well as lines which are not used for passenger services.

List 

Notes

Countries currently without a rail network

Countries which formerly had railways

Countries which have never had railways 

  – Bermuda Railway operated 1931 to 1948 (a dependency rather than a country)
Railways of the World contains a wealth of information, listed country by country.

Definition 
For the purposes of this page 'railway' has been defined as a fixed route laid with rails along which 'wagons' can be transported. Movement of those 'wagons' may be person, animal or locomotive powered. Items transported in those 'wagons' may be materials or persons. Temporary lines, laid for a specific purpose then removed, have not been considered. Examples of 'temporary' would include construction projects and supply lines during conflicts. In most cases 'temporary' lines were in countries which also had 'permanent' lines so the distinction is not important, except when considering historical peak extent. Railway track considers the basics.

Country is determined by reference to United Nations membership status. This is the List of sovereign states. Refer also to ISO 3166 Codes for the representation of names of countries and their subdivisions – Part 1: Country codes. This defines codes for the names of countries, dependent territories, and special areas of geographical interest. ISO 3166-1 numeric – three-digit country codes which are identical to those developed and maintained by the United Nations Statistics Division.

See also
 List of countries by rail usage
 Rail transport by country

References 
Primary source
UIC data
Citations

Transport network size
Rail transport network size